Alexandra Park railway station may refer to:

 Alexandra Palace railway station in North London, named Wood Green (Alexandra Park) between 1 June 1864 and 18 March 1871
 Alexandra Palace railway station (1873–1954) in North London, named Alexandra Park between March 1891 and April 1892
 Alexandra Parade railway station in Glasgow, originally named Alexandra Park and renamed on 9 July 1923
 Muswell Hill railway station in North London, originally named Alexandra Park (Muswell Hill) and renamed on 1 May 1875
 Wilbraham Road railway station in Manchester, originally named Alexandra Park and renamed on 1 July 1923